Brendan John O'Connell (born 12 November 1966) is a former professional footballer who made 451 appearances and scored 79 goals in the Football League playing as a midfielder for Portsmouth, Exeter City, Burnley, Huddersfield Town, Barnsley, Charlton Athletic and Wigan Athletic. Forced to retire from playing because of a blood clot in his leg, O'Connell went on to coach Wigan Athletic's youth and reserve teams, played briefly for Rossendale United in the North West Counties League, and in 2003 became player/assistant manager of Northwich Victoria.

References

External links

1966 births
Living people
Footballers from Lambeth
English footballers
Association football midfielders
Portsmouth F.C. players
Exeter City F.C. players
Burnley F.C. players
Huddersfield Town A.F.C. players
Barnsley F.C. players
Charlton Athletic F.C. players
Wigan Athletic F.C. players
Rossendale United F.C. players
Northwich Victoria F.C. players
English Football League players